182 kDa tankyrase-1-binding protein is an enzyme that in humans is encoded by the TNKS1BP1 gene.

Interactions 

TNKS1BP1 has been shown to interact with TNKS.

References

Further reading